Ishkashim, also transliterated Eshkashem or Ishkoshim, may refer to:

 Ishkashim, Afghanistan, a town in Badakhshan Province
 Ishkashim, Tajikistan, a town in Gorno-Badakshan Autonomous Province
 Ishkashim District in Badakhshan Province of Afghanistan
 Ishkashim District in Gorno-Badakhshan Autonomous Province
 Ishkashimi language, spoken in Afghanistan and Tajikistan